Belle Mead is an unincorporated community and census-designated place (CDP) located within Montgomery Township, in Somerset County, in the U.S. state of New Jersey.

History

Up until about 1875, Belle Mead, then named Plainville, was considered to be part of the community of Harlingen. It was a quiet farming region when about that time a New York City contractor named Van Aken bought up all the local farms and set out to develop a city. He had the farms laid out into lots, some streets put through and named after the style of New York. He donated land for the railroad station that had a dining room underneath (the station was torn down in February, 1940).  There is an abandoned train station in Belle Mead. When Van Aken went broke, the property was sold to a U.S. Senator, John R. McPherson, who changed the name from Vanaken to Belle Mead in honor of his daughter, Edna Belle Mead McPherson, according to one popular story.

Woods Tavern in Belle Mead was a popular stop for travelers for more than 100 years and played an important social and political role. Horace Greeley spoke there in 1872 as part of his campaign for President of the United States. The tavern burned down in 1932.

James Baldwin, the 20th-century author and civil rights advocate, lived in Belle Mead in the early 1940s.

Dr. John Summerskill and his wife, Mimi LaFollette Summerskill established the LaFollette Vineyard in Belle Mead in the 1970s. President Bill Clinton and 14 Democratic governors  met for a strategy session and press conference at the vineyard during the 1992 presidential campaign.

The abandoned train station was built by Reading Railroad in the 1930s, and was removed from service in 1984. Since then, restoration projects have been announced, however, not one has progressed any further than cleaning up tree debris and graffiti.

The Belle Mead section straddles the northern portion of Montgomery Township and the southern portion of Hillsborough Township.  For many years residents of Belle Mead had been served by the Belle Mead Post Office located on Route 206 in Montgomery Township having ZIP code 08502.  In the late 1990s, Hillsborough Township was granted its own post office serving all of its residents (ZIP code 08844), including that section of town formerly serving the Belle Mead area.  Since that time the Belle Mead post office and its associated ZIP code (08502) serves only the remaining area of Belle Mead located in the northern section of Montgomery Township.

Geography
According to the United States Census Bureau, Belle Mead had a total area of 0.740 square miles (1.917 km2), all of which is land.

Demographics

Census 2010

Notable people 

People who were born in, residents of, or otherwise closely associated with Belle Mead include:
 Wade Baldwin IV (born 1996), basketball player for Maccabi Tel Aviv of the Israeli Basketball Premier League.
 Mike Ford (born 1992), first baseman for the Los Angeles Angels.
 Brandon Grosso (born 2000), racecar driver in the ARCA Menards Series.
 Ricky Proehl (born 1968), wide receiver who played for 17 seasons in the NFL.
 Elliott F. Smith (1931–1987), politician who served in the New Jersey General Assembly from 1978 to 1984, representing the 16th Legislative District.
 Arlene White Lawrence (1916–1990), bishop and the third president and general superintendent of the Pillar of Fire Church.

References

External links

Census-designated places in New Jersey
Census-designated places in Somerset County, New Jersey
Montgomery Township, New Jersey